The University of California, Santa Barbara (UC Santa Barbara or UCSB) is a public land-grant research university in Santa Barbara, California. It is part of the University of California 10-university system. Tracing its roots back to 1891 as an independent teachers' college, UCSB joined the University of California system in 1944 and is the third-oldest undergraduate campus in the system, after UC Berkeley and UCLA. In 2021, the university enrolled 23,196 undergraduate and 2,983 graduate students.

Located on a WWII-era Marine Corps air station, UC Santa Barbara is organized into three undergraduate colleges (Letters and Science, Engineering, Creative Studies) and two graduate schools (Education and Environmental Science & Management), offering more than 200 degrees and programs. UCSB is classified among "R1: Doctoral Universities – Very high research activity" and is regarded as a Public Ivy. The university has 10 national research centers, including the Kavli Institute for Theoretical Physics. UCSB has various organized research units (ORUs) researching evolutionary psychology, neuroscience, marine science, and more. According to the National Science Foundation, UC Santa Barbara spent $235 million on research and development in fiscal year 2018, ranking it 100th in the nation. UCSB was the No. 3 host on the ARPAnet and was elected to the Association of American Universities in 1995.

Current UCSB faculty includes 6 Nobel Prize laureates, 1 Fields Medalist, 39 members of the National Academy of Sciences, 27 members of the National Academy of Engineering, and 34 members of the American Academy of Arts and Sciences. The faculty also includes two Academy and Emmy Award winners and recipients of a Millennium Technology Prize, an IEEE Medal of Honor, a National Medal of Technology and Innovation and a Breakthrough Prize in Fundamental Physics.

History

UCSB traces its origins back to the Anna Blake School, which was founded in 1891, and offered training in home economics and industrial arts. The Anna Blake School was taken over by the state in 1909 and became the Santa Barbara State Normal School, which then became the Santa Barbara State College in 1921.

In 1944, intense lobbying by an interest group in the City of Santa Barbara led by Thomas Storke and Pearl Chase persuaded the State Legislature, Gov. Earl Warren, and the Regents of the University of California to move the State College over to the more research-oriented University of California system. The State College system sued to stop the takeover, but the governor did not support the suit. A state constitutional amendment was passed in 1946 to stop subsequent conversions of State Colleges to University of California campuses.

From 1944 to 1958, the school was known as Santa Barbara College of the University of California, before taking on its current name. When the vacated Marine Corps training station in Goleta was purchased for the rapidly growing college, Santa Barbara City College moved into the vacated State College buildings.

Originally, the regents envisioned a small, several thousand–student liberal arts college, a so-called "Williams College of the West", at Santa Barbara. Chronologically, UCSB is the third general-education campus of the University of California, after Berkeley and UCLA (the only other state campus to have been acquired by the UC system). The original campus the regents acquired in Santa Barbara was located on only  of largely unusable land on a seaside mesa. The availability of a  portion of the land used as Marine Corps Air Station Santa Barbara until 1946 on another seaside mesa in Goleta, which the regents could acquire for free from the federal government, led to that site becoming the Santa Barbara campus in 1949.

Originally, only 3000–3500 students were anticipated, but the post-WWII baby boom led to the designation of general campus in 1958, along with a name change from "Santa Barbara College" to "University of California, Santa Barbara," and the discontinuation of the industrial arts program for which the state college was famous. A chancellor, Samuel B. Gould, was appointed in 1959.

In 1959, UCSB professor Douwe Stuurman hosted the English writer Aldous Huxley as the university's first visiting professor. Huxley delivered a lectures series called "The Human Situation".

In the late '60s and early '70s, UCSB became nationally known as a hotbed of anti–Vietnam War activity. A bombing at the school's faculty club in 1969 killed the caretaker, Dover Sharp. In the spring of 1970, multiple occasions of arson occurred, including a burning of the Bank of America branch building in the student community of Isla Vista, during which time one male student, Kevin Moran, was shot and killed by police. UCSB's anti-Vietnam activity impelled then-Gov. Ronald Reagan to impose a curfew and order the National Guard to enforce it. Armed guardsmen were a common sight on campus and in Isla Vista during this time.

In 1995, UCSB was elected to the Association of American Universities, an organization of leading research universities, with a membership consisting of 59 universities in the United States (both public and private) and two universities in Canada.

On May 23, 2014, a killing spree occurred in Isla Vista, California, a community in close proximity to the campus. All six people killed during the rampage were students at UCSB. The murderer was a former Santa Barbara City College student who lived in Isla Vista.

Provosts and chancellors

Provosts:
1944–1946: Clarence L. Phelps
1946–1955: J. Harold Williams
1955–1955: Clark G. Kuebler
1956–1956: John C. Snidecor (acting)
1956–1959: Elmer Noble
Chancellors:
1959–1962: Samuel B. Gould
1962–1977: Vernon Cheadle
1977–1986: Robert Huttenback
1986–1987: Daniel G. Aldrich (acting)
1987–1994: Barbara Uehling
1994–present: Henry T. Yang

Santa Barbara State College was under the supervision of a president, but in 1944, when it became a campus of the University of California, the title of the chief executive was changed to provost. In September 1958, the Regents of the University of California established Santa Barbara as a general university campus, and the official title of the chief executive was changed to chancellor. UCSB's first provost was thus Clarence L. Phelps, while UCSB's first chancellor was Samuel B. Gould.

Campus

UCSB is located on cliffs directly above the Pacific Ocean. UCSB's campus is completely autonomous from local government and has not been annexed by the city of Santa Barbara, and thus is not part of the city. While it appears closer to the recently formed city of Goleta, a parcel of the City of Santa Barbara that forms a strip of "city" through the ocean to the Santa Barbara airport, runs through the west entrance to the university campus. Although UCSB has a Santa Barbara mailing address, as do other unincorporated areas around the city, only this entry parcel is in the Santa Barbara city limits. The campuses surround the unincorporated community of Isla Vista.

UCSB is one of a few universities in the United States with its own beach. The campus, bordered on two sides by the Pacific Ocean, has miles of coastline, its own lagoon, and the rocky extension, Goleta Point, which is also known as "Campus Point". The campus has numerous walking and bicycle paths across campus, around the lagoon and along the beach. It owns and manages Coal Oil Point nature preserve on the West Campus.

Much of the campus's early architecture was designed by famed architect William Pereira and his partner Charles Luckman, and made heavy use of custom tinted and patterned concrete block. This design element was carried over into many of the school's subsequent buildings.

Recently, it has been announced that the campus will feature a new four-story building, set to be completed by 2023.

The lagoon is a large body of water adjacent to the coastline, between San Rafael and San Miguel Residence Halls. It was created from a former tidal salt marsh flat, and is fed by a combination of runoff and ocean water used by the Marine Science Building's aquatic life tanks; thus it's a unique combination of fresh and salt water.

The UCSB Libraries, consisting of the Davidson Library and the Arts Library, hold more than three million bound volumes and millions of microforms, government documents, manuscripts, maps, satellite and aerial images, sound recordings, and other materials. Situated at the center of campus, the Davidson Library in June 2013 broke ground on a significant addition and renovation project, which was completed in November 2015 with re-opening to the public in January 2016.

Campbell Hall is the university's largest lecture hall with 862 seats. It's also the main venue for the UCSB Arts & Lectures series, which presents special performances, films, and lectures for the UCSB campus and Santa Barbara community.

Storke Tower, completed in 1969, is the tallest steel/cement structure in Santa Barbara County. It can be seen from most places on campus, and it overlooks Storke Plaza. It is home to a five-octave, 61-bell carillon. KCSB 91.9 and the Daily Nexus have headquarters beneath Storke Tower.

The UCSB Family Vacation Center, founded in 1969, is a summer family camp located on campus that draws over 2,000 guests each summer. The staff of over 50 includes many UCSB students who have been extensively trained as camp counselors.

Layout

The university (itself termed a campus of the University of California) is divided into two physical campuses: West Campus and East Campus. The vast majority of university facilities, including all lecture halls and laboratories, are in the East Campus. The two campuses are connected by a large strip (known as the North and Storke Campuses) to the north which contain university housing and athletic fields. Thus, the university surrounds Isla Vista on three sides. West Campus, aside from a few buildings dedicated to faculty housing, has largely been leased out to private organizations, and includes a school for the disabled (part of the Devereux Foundation) and a large nature preserve, the Coal Oil Point Reserve. The largest sand dunes on the south-facing coast of the Santa Barbara Channel are located here.

The East Campus centers around two quadrangles, separated from each other by the Davidson (main) Library and bus circle, and the life sciences buildings. Along the western quad are Storke Plaza and buildings housing the various arts, social sciences, and humanities departments. The Student Resource Building and the Events Center are also located along this quad. Surrounding the wider, park-like eastern quad are buildings housing the physical sciences departments and the College of Engineering. Directly to the south of, but not adjacent to, the eastern quad are the life sciences and psychology departments, as well as most of the on-campus housing. The southernmost section of the campus is dominated by the lagoon. The peninsula extending from the beach into the lagoon contains a labyrinth.

Bicycles
UCSB is known for its extensive biking system. A recent survey says that 53% of UCSB students get around by cycling. Bicycles have exclusive right of way on a series of specifically designated paths throughout East Campus. Bicycle stands and lockers are ubiquitous. There is a bicycle registration service at the Community Service Organization (CSO) office in order to prevent theft and increase the likelihood of bike recovery. UCSB is unique among bicycle-heavy areas in that most travel is done within a small radius.

Academics

UC Santa Barbara is a large, comprehensive, primarily residential doctoral university. The full-time, four-year undergraduate program comprises the majority of enrollments and has an arts & sciences focus with high graduate coexistence. UCSB is organized into five colleges and schools offering 87 undergraduate degrees and 55 graduate degrees. The campus is the sixth-largest in the UC system by enrollment with 18,620 undergraduate and 3,065 graduate students. In 2015, UCSB was designated a Hispanic-Serving Institution.

Admissions

Admission to UC Santa Barbara is rated as "most selective" by U.S. News & World Report.

UC Santa Barbara received 93,442 applications for admission to the Fall 2019 incoming freshman class; 27,719 were admitted, with an acceptance rate of 29.7%. The GPA and test scores for the middle 25%-75% of admitted students is as follows: range of enrolled freshmen SAT scores was 630–730 for evidence-based reading and writing, 650–790 for math, while the ACT composite middle 50% range was 26–31.

Research activity
According to the UCSB Office of Research, UC Santa Barbara budgeted $235.3 million on research and development in fiscal 2020, with the National Science Foundation contributing $60.5 million; Department of Defense-$40 million; UC General Fund-$28 million; Industry- $19.5 million; National Institutes of Health-$17 million; Department of Energy-$9 million; Non-Profit-$8.7 million; Other-$20 million. Corporate research partners in the College of Engineering include military contractors Raytheon Vision Systems, Lockheed Martin and Northrop Grumman.

From 2005 to 2009, UCSB was ranked fourth in terms of relative citation impact in the U.S. (behind MIT, Caltech, and Princeton University) according to Thomson Reuters.

UCSB hosts 12 National Research Centers, including the Kavli Institute for Theoretical Physics, the National Center for Ecological Analysis and Synthesis, the Southern California Earthquake Center, the UCSB Center for Spatial Studies, an affiliate of the National Center for Geographic Information and Analysis, and the California Nanosystems Institute. Eight of these centers are supported by the National Science Foundation. UCSB is also home to Microsoft Station Q, a research group working on topological quantum computing where American mathematician and Fields Medalist Michael Freedman is the director.

Teaching and degrees
The focus of the University of California is on research. Like all University of California campuses, UCSB prioritizes academic development over vocational learning. Undergraduate teaching is centered on lectures, with larger lecture classes having sections. Sections may be tutorial style, or they may be set up as seminars or discussions. For undergraduates, UCSB confers both B.A. and B.S. degrees. Music majors may pursue a Bachelor of Music degree. Graduate teaching involves seminar style classes and an emphasis on research and further study. UCSB confers M.A., M.S., and Ph.D degrees. Those studying music may pursue a MM or DMA degree. Students pursuing a career in education may receive a MEd or EdD degree. The university granted 5,812 bachelor's, 578 master's, and 354 Ph.D degrees in 2010–2011.

Rankings

UCSB is considered to be a "Public Ivy". The 2021 edition of U.S. News & World Report ranked UC Santa Barbara as tied for the 6th best public university and tied for the 30th best university in the United States. Money magazine ranked UC Santa Barbara 30th in the U.S. out of the 744 schools it evaluated for its 2019 Best Colleges ranking. In 2019, Kiplinger ranked UCSB 30th out of 174 best-value public colleges and universities in the nation, and fifth in California. UC Santa Barbara was ranked 32nd in the United States out of 1,380 colleges and universities by Payscale and CollegeNet's 2018 Social Mobility Index rankings.

Research impact rankings

The Times Higher Education World University Rankings ranked UCSB 48th worldwide for 2016–17, while the Academic Ranking of World Universities (ARWU) in 2016 ranked UCSB 42nd in the world, 28th in the nation, and in 2015 tied for 17th worldwide in engineering.

In the United States National Research Council rankings of graduate programs, 10 UCSB departments were ranked in the top ten in the country: Materials, Chemical Engineering, Computer Science, Electrical and Computer Engineering, Mechanical Engineering, Physics, Marine Science Institute, Geography, History, and Theater and Dance. Among U.S. university Materials Science and Engineering programs, UCSB was ranked first in each measure of a study by the National Research Council of the NAS

The Centre for Science and Technologies Studies at Leiden University in the Netherlands ranked UCSB as the seventh-best research university in the world based on mean normalized citation score, and as the second best in the world based on the proportion of the publications to the top 10% most frequently cited.

The Global Research Report: United States published by Thomson Reuters in November 2010 rated UCSB's research fourth nationally in citation impact.

Among U.S. university economics programs, in 2010 UCSB was ranked sixth for experimental economics, third for environmental economics, and 12th for cognitive and behavioral economics by RePEc.

Washington Monthly named UCSB as the 20th best national university in 2020, based on its contribution to the public good as measured by social mobility, research, and promoting public service.

Other rankings

In the United States National Research Council rankings of graduate programs, 10 UCSB departments were ranked in the top ten in the country: Materials, Chemical Engineering, Computer Science, Electrical and Computer Engineering, Mechanical Engineering, Physics, Marine Science Institute, Geography, History, and Theater and Dance.

U.S. News & World Reports 2016 rankings placed UCSB's graduate programs in Materials Engineering and Chemical Engineering the second and ninth best in the U.S., respectively; graduate school Physics was ranked 10th best, including the fifth-best program for Condensed Matter Physics, seventh-best program for Quantum Physics, seventh-best program for Elementary Particles/Field/String Theory, and eighth-best program for Cosmology/Relativity/Gravity. In terms of the social sciences, UCSB's graduate program in Sociology is ranked first for research in sex and gender, and the History department is ranked seventh for women's history.

UCSB's Department of Communication was recognized as top in the nation based on data from the National Research Council's study. Several areas in UCSB's Department of Communication have been Ranked Best in Nation by the National Communication Association. Specifically, UCSB's Department of Communication has been ranked first in the nation for Interpersonal and Small Group Communication, first in the nation for Intercultural/International Communication, second in the nation Organizational Communication, fourth in the nation for Communication and Technology, and 17th in the nation for Mass Communication.

UCSB's Department of Communication has been ranked third in the nation in terms of research productivity, according to a recent analysis of scholarly articles that have appeared in eight academic journals sponsored by the National Communication Association and the International Communication Association. In addition, UCSB's Department of Communication has been named one of the top high-impact departments in the nation.

In 2015, QS World University Rankings ranked UCSB 129th in the world.

Forbes magazine ranked the university 114th in the nation (and 50th best research university) in July 2016. This ranking focuses mainly on net positive financial impact, in contrast to other rankings, and generally ranks liberal arts colleges above most research universities.

PayScale's 2015–16 College Salary Report (ranking universities in terms of graduates' salary potential), UCSB came in first in computer science, seventh in engineering, 14th in Humanities, and 30th in Social Sciences.

UCSB was ranked third in The Princeton Reviews 2015 list of top party schools.

Organization

Santa Barbara is one of the ten major campuses affiliated with the University of California. The University of California is governed by a 26-member Board of Regents, 18 of which are appointed by the Governor of California to 12-year terms, seven serving as ex officio members, and a single student regent. The position of chancellor was created in 1952 to lead individual campuses. The Board of Regents appointed Henry T. Yang to be the fifth chancellor of the university in 1994.

Colleges and schools
College of Creative Studies
College of Engineering
College of Letters & Science
Bren School of Environmental Science & Management
Gevirtz Graduate School of Education

UC Santa Barbara has three colleges: the College of Letters & Science, the College of Engineering, and the College of Creative Studies. The College of Creative Studies offers students an alternative approach to education by supporting advanced, independent work in the arts, mathematics, and sciences. The campus also has two professional schools: the Bren School of Environmental Science & Management, located in Bren Hall, and the Gevirtz Graduate School of Education.

Institutes and programs
Founded in 1973, the Institute for Social, Behavioral, and Economic Research (ISBER), originally the Community and Organization Research Institute (CORI), is the research unit for work in the social sciences. In 1990, it absorbed the Social Process Research Institute''' (SPRI), and its work now includes the humanities.

In February 2015, UCSB opened The Confucius Institute on campus, one of about 400 installments located around the world. It will be aimed at promoting the study of Chinese language, culture, history, science, politics, and economics.

In 2008, the Institute for Energy Efficiency was founded with the goal to establish a new, cross-disciplinary institute that would integrate the many diverse research projects in energy efficiency and provide a focus for work in this area.

Academic year
The university runs on a quarter system. There are three terms in the normal academic year: fall, winter, and spring, as well as a summer term. At the beginning of each term, there are one to three days of pre-instructional activities, where faculty meet to discuss instructional plans. During this period, students acquaint themselves to the campus and have the opportunity to take placement tests. At the end of each term, one week is devoted to final exams and special academic activities. There are 146 days of instruction, with a minimum of 48 per term.

Student activities and traditions

Social
UCSB is a politically active campus. For the 2008 presidential election, UCSB won a national college competition for student voter registration by registering 10,857 voters, or 51.5% of the student population. Over the years, many political parties and organizations have been known to be active on campus, such as the College Republicans, Campus Democrats, Green Party, Libertarians, NORML, Young Democratic Socialists of America, and Queer Student Union.

There are a variety of on campus centers offering social, recreational, religious, and preprofessional activities for students. The UCSB Multicultural Center puts on numerous activities every year to support students of color and promote awareness of diversity issues on campus. Other organizations and centers include The Daily Nexus, a daily newspaper; the school radio station, KCSB 91.9; The Bottom Line, a weekly newspaper; and The Gaucho Free Press, the campus's conservative magazine.

The UCSB Recreation Center also hosts a variety of activities, from adventure programs to ballroom dancing classes. Further, UCSB Hillel offers a space for UCSB's large Jewish population and a place for Jewish students to come together in a unique building in Isla Vista. Students socialize at the Arbor, the UCen, the Coral Tree Cafe, the Courtyard Cafe, and for a special lunch, the Club and Guest House.

UCSB is also known for its annual free music festival, Extravaganza. It is held at Harder Stadium in the spring and generally attracts around 8,000 people. Past performers have included Nas, T.I., E-40, Sublime, Run-D.M.C., The Pharcyde, Social Distortion, Jack Johnson, Drake, Dada Life, Jane's Addiction, and Snoop Dogg, among many others.

The Nu chapter of Phrateres, a non-exclusive nonprofit social-service club, was installed here in 1939. Between 1924 and 1967, 23 chapters of Phrateres were installed in universities across North America.

 Greek life 

Housing

There are eight residence halls at UCSB, seven of which are located at the main campus. One, Santa Catalina (formerly Francisco Torres Towers), is located near the entrance to West Campus north of Isla Vista.

Santa Catalina has its own dining commons, Portola Dining Commons, as well as a heated swimming pool, two lounges, numerous study rooms, two recreational rooms, a gym, as well as tennis courts and an expansive lawn.

The Main Campus residence halls are found in two different locations. On the east end of campus are the residence halls named after five of the Channel Islands: Santa Rosa, Santa Cruz, Anacapa, San Miguel and San Nicolas. There are two dining commons located near the Channel Islands residence halls. The Ortega Dining Commons is located between San Miguel and the University Center (UCen), and the De La Guerra Dining Commons is located between Santa Rosa, Santa Cruz, and San Nicolas.

The two other residence halls, San Rafael and Manzanita Village, are located on the west side of campus and primarily house continuing and transfer students. The Carrillo Dining Commons is located in Manzanita Village, right next to San Rafael Hall. Manzanita Village was completed in 2002, and is the newest residence hall on campus.

In addition, the university also has four housing complexes for graduate students and their families: San Clemente Villages for single graduate students, Santa Ynez Apartments, El Dorado Apartments, Westgate Apartments, and family student housing: West Campus Apartments and the Storke Apartment complexes. There is also faculty housing at the West Campus Point and new construction underway at the North Campus. The Sierra Madre Villages, located by the West Campus Apartments, was completed in September 2015 and was the first residential complex certified as LEED platinum throughout the entire UC system. UC Santa Barbara is the only campus in the UC system with any "LEED for Homes" certifications.

Billionaire Charles Munger has promised the university a $200 million donation on condition that it builds an 11-story dormitory, to be called Munger Hall, following his design, which assigns each of 4,536 residents a small individual room, 94% without natural light, in order to house more students and to encourage socialization in common areas. UCSB's acceptance of the proposal, presented in October 2021, led to the resignation of architect Dennis McFadden from the campus design review committee, followed by protests from students and from others including the AIA. In October 2022, the plan was modified to eliminate two floors, reducing the capacity of the building to 3,500.

Private residence halls are also available to UCSB students. Tropicana Del Norte, located directly adjacent to the Main Campus, houses UCSB students in 51 furnished suites, and has an on-site dining hall and heated pool.

Students may also choose to rent housing in the bordering community of Isla Vista. An estimated average for rent costs is $500 to $800 a month to share a bedroom, and includes trash pickup and water utilities. Parking on UCSB's campus is restricted during the day to students living farther than 2 miles from campus, so many Isla Vista residents often bike to class. Low-cost housing is limited, with the cheapest source being the Santa Barbara Student Housing Cooperative.

Other sources of housing include the Greek system, and outlying communities (i.e., Goleta, Santa Barbara, Isla Vista, Montecito). Some students live in Isla Vista, which is immediately adjacent to campus. Since the early '60s, Isla Vista has had a reputation of being a party environment. UCSB is also affiliated with the Santa Barbara Student Housing Cooperative in Isla Vista, which seeks to provide low rent co-op housing regardless of gender, race, social, political, or religious affiliation, thereby influencing the community to eliminate prejudice and discrimination in the community.

Services
There are a number of academic resources offered by the university, including a writing center, open computer labs, a machine shop, a career and counseling center, and drop-in academic advising.

The UCSB Recreation Center provides classes and facilities for students and faculty. The center has swimming pools, racquetball courts, a rock wall, and exercise machines. The University Center has facilities for meetings and presentations, and also contains a bookstore, restaurants, and a cashier.

UCSB has a health clinic. Students with ailments or seeking medical assistance may consult a physician at the clinic. The clinic also offers basic healthcare, and provides emergency medicine and contraceptives. The university is the only UC campus with its own paramedic rescue unit. It's staffed by full-time professional paramedics and part-time undergraduate EMTs.

SexInfo, which was started in 1976 by professors John and Janice Baldwin, is run by students doing advanced course work and research on sexuality through UCSB's Sociology Department. The site is dedicated to providing accurate information about sexuality in a way that is both informative and personal. SexInfo answers questions sent in by readers from all over the world, as well as regularly updates and posts articles on various topics related to human sexuality. This program helps students getting their degree in psychology.

Athletics

The mascot of UCSB is the Gaucho and the school colors are blue and gold. UCSB's sports teams compete in the Big West Conference, with the exception of the men's water polo, men's and women's swimming, and the men's volleyball teams, which are in the Mountain Pacific Sports Federation. Santa Barbara is best known for its men's swimming and men's soccer teams. In 2006, UCSB won their first NCAA men's soccer title and its second overall NCAA championship (1979 water polo) in school history.

While there are some 400 students in ICA, there are over 700 in club sports teams, including Alpine racing, cycling, fencing, field hockey, lacrosse, roller hockey, rugby, sailing, soccer, triathlon, ultimate frisbee, water ski, and rowing. Many of these teams are highly regarded and compete against Intercollegiate teams from across the U.S. For example, rowing has produced several national team members including nine-time National Rowing Team member Amy Fuller, winner of several Olympic and World Championship medals, and currently head of the UCLA Rowing Program. The UCSB cycling team has also produced several national team members, Olympians, and members of numerous U.S. and international professional teams.

Hundreds of students participate in a large intramural program consisting of badminton, basketball, bowling, flag football, golf, floor hockey, indoor and outdoor soccer, racquetball, squash, running, softball, tennis, table tennis, ultimate frisbee, volleyball, inner-tube water polo, and kickball.

Surfing also draws many students to UCSB. The on-campus beaches include a number of decent surfing sites, including "Poles," "Campus Point," "Depressions" and "Sands" and "Devereaux Point" on West Campus. Because Campus Beach actually faces south and east, and is shielded by the Santa Barbara Channel Islands, the surf is usually quite small. However, a large north or west swell can wrap in to create great waves that are typically very clean and good for surfing. UCSB has a surf team that competes in National Scholastic Surfing Association competitions and is generally considered one of the best in the nation. They continued their reputation by winning a record 14th national title at the college level in 2010's finals.

People

Notable faculty

Current UCSB faculty have received several prestigious awards, including six Nobel Prizes and a Fields Medal. In addition, there are 29 members of the National Academy of Sciences, 27 members of the National Academy of Engineering, and 31 members of the Academy of Arts and Sciences on the faculty.

Allison Anders, American film and television director
Tanya Atwater, professor of Geology, known for work on plate tectonics
Stanley Awramik, professor of Geology, bio-geologist and expert on Precambrian deposits and the origin of life
Alison Brysk, Mellichamp chair in global governance, Global Studies Department
Charles Bazerman, Distinguished Professor of Education at the Gevirtz Graduate School of Education and College of Creative Studies Writing & Literature faculty, 2020 Exemplar Award Winner from the Conference on College Composition and Communication (CCCC) and founder of the International Society for the Advancement of Writing Research and its international conference, Writing Research Across Borders (WRAB).
Walter Holden Capps (1934–1997), also known as Walter H. Capps. Religious Studies professor. U.S. Representative from California 22nd District (Democrat), 1997; (defeated, 1994) died in office 1997.
Nick Carter, 1928 Olympian, track coach (1939–1958)
Michael G. Crandall, professor emeritus of mathematics, winner of the Leroy P. Steele Prize for Seminal Contribution to Research
Leda Cosmides, Distinguished Professor of Psychological & Brain Sciences, co-founder of modern Evolutionary Psychology
Glen Culler, professor of Electrical Engineering, principal investigator for UCSB ARPAnet
Dimitrije Dordevic (1922–2009), professor of Balkan History
Renzo Fenci (1914–1999), professor of Fine Art from 1947 until 1954.
Matthew P. A. Fisher, professor of physics, is known for several major contributions to condensed matter physics
Michael Freedman, 1986 Fields Medalist and director of Microsoft Station Q
Kip Fulbeck, professor of art, author, and artist exploring Hapa identity
Michael Gazzaniga, director of the SAGE Center for the Study of the Mind and professor of Psychology, leading researcher in the field of cognitive neuroscience
Colin Gardner, professor of Integrative Studies/Critical Theory, Departments of Art, Film & Media Studies, Comparative Literature, and the History of Art and Architecture
Howard Giles, professor of Communication, creator of communication accommodation theory
Michael Frank Goodchild, professor of Geography, winner of the 2007 Lauréat Prix International de Géographie Vautrin Lud
David J. Gross, director of the Kavli Institute for Theoretical Physics and 2004 Nobel laureate in Physics
Alan J. Heeger, professor of Physics and of Materials and 2000 Nobel laureate in Chemistry
Robert Hetzron (1938–1997), linguist and professor of Germanic, Oriental and Slavic Languages.
C. Warren Hollister (1930–1997), historian of medieval Europe
Immanuel C.Y. Hsu, sinologist and emeritus professor of History
Tania Israel, professor of Counseling, Clinical, and School Psychology, and specialist mental health and LGBTQ peoples and communities.
Jacob Israelachvili, professor of Chemical Engineering and Materials, elected fellow of the Royal Society of London, 1988
Heejung Kim, professor of psychological and brain sciences
Charles Kolstad, chair of the Economics Department and professor of Environmental Economics
Walter Kohn, founding director, Kavli Institute for Theoretical Physics, research professor of Physics and 1998 Nobel laureate in Chemistry
Herbert Kroemer, professor of Electrical and Computer Engineering and of Materials and 2000 Nobel laureate in Physics
Finn E. Kydland, professor of Economics and 2004 Nobel laureate in Economics
L. Gary Leal, Warren & Katharine Schlinger Professor of Chemical Engineering
Luis Leal (1907–2010), Mexican-American writer and literary critic
Nelson Lichtenstein, labor historian, MacArthur Foundation Chair in History
Bruce H. Lipshutz, professor of Chemistry and Biochemistry
George Lipsitz, professor of Sociology and African American Studies, expert on critical race theory and whiteness studies
Harold Lewis, emeritus professor of Physics and former department chairman
Leonard Marsak (1924–2013), historian of modern Europe
N. Scott Momaday, Native American author, winner of the Pulitzer Prize and recipient of the National Medal of Arts
William W. Murdoch, Charles A. Storke II professor of population ecology, recipient of the 1990 Robert H. MacArthur Award, and AAAS Fellow known for his research in population regulation, biological control, and predator-prey relationships
Shuji Nakamura, professor of Materials and 2014 Nobel laureate in Physics, Japanese inventor of the bright green, white and blue GaN LEDs and a blue laser. Recipient of the Millennium Technology Prize from the Finnish government in 2006
John Nathan, Takashima Professor of Japanese Cultural Studies and Emmy award-winning director of several documentaries
Joachim Remak (1920–2001), historian of modern Europe
Jeffrey Burton Russell, professor emeritus, historian of medieval Europe
Paul Spickard, history professor, named Distinguished Lecturer by Organization of American Historians, 2001 recipient of The Loving Prize for research on mixed racial and cultural experiences
Jeffrey C. Stewart, Black Studies professor, recipient of the 2018 National Book Award for Nonfiction and 2019 Pulitzer Prize in Biography 
Galen D. Stucky, E. Khashoggi Industries, LLC Professor in Letters and Science, professor of Chemistry and Biochemistry, Materials Departments
James A. Thomson, adjunct professor of Molecular, Cellular & Developmental Biology, "father of stem-cell research"
John Tooby, Distinguished Professor of Anthropology, co-founder of modern Evolutionary Psychology
Frank Wilczek, Chancellor Robert Huttenback Professor of Physics (1981–88), American theoretical physicist, mathematician and a Nobel laureate.
Anthony Zee, theoretical physicist and Pulitzer Prize nominee. Known for applying quantum field theory to such problems as RNA folding and visual processing.

Notable alumni

UC Santa Barbara alumni have become notable in many varied fields, both academic and otherwise. Carol Greider, who won the Nobel Prize in Physiology or Medicine (2009), graduated from the College of Creative Studies with a B.A. in biology in 1983. Robert Ballard, oceanographer who discovered the RMS Titanic in 1985, graduated from UCSB in 1965 with a degree in chemistry and geology.

Actors who have studied at UCSB include Academy Award winner Michael Douglas, who received a B.A. in drama in 1968 and who is honorary president of the UCSB Alumni Association, and Gwyneth Paltrow, who studied anthropology before dropping out to act.

Filmmakers who have studied at UCSB include Academy Award nominee Don Hertzfeldt, who received a B.A. in Film Studies in 1998; Gregg Araki, director of films like Mysterious Skin and The Doom Generation, who got his B.A. from UCSB in 1982; Brad Silberling, director of films like Moonlight Mile and Lemony Snicket's A Series of Unfortunate Events; and Gavin Garrison, who received a B.A. in Global Studies in 2007 and now produces the Emmy-nominated television show Whale Wars; and Forrest Galante, wildlife biologist and star of Extinct or Alive on the Animal Planet Network.

Musicians who have attended include Robby Krieger, guitarist in The Doors, singer-songwriter Jack Johnson, singer and guitarist for The Beach Boys, Jeffrey Foskett, and electro-house musician Steve Aoki.

Chairman of the Oracle Corporation Jeffrey O. Henley graduated with a B.A. in Economics in 1966, while Knut Vollebæk, former foreign minister of Norway, graduated with a degree in Political Science in 1973.

Athletes who have studied at UCSB include swimmer and four-time Olympic gold medalist Jason Lezak, NBA player and head coach Brian Shaw, and UCLA basketball coach Cori Close. Television journalist Katy Tur of NBC and MSNBC received a degree in 2005, and Elizabeth Wagmeister of Page Six TV and Variety graduated with a B.A. in communications in 2012.

Demographics

The United States Census Bureau has designated the UC Santa Barbara campus as a separate census-designated place (CDP) for statistical purposes. It first appeared as a CDP in the 2020 Census with a population of 9,710.

2020 censusNote: the US Census treats Hispanic/Latino as an ethnic category. This table excludes Latinos from the racial categories and assigns them to a separate category. Hispanics/Latinos can be of any race.''

See also 

 2014 Isla Vista killings

Notes

References

External links

 
 UC Santa Barbara Athletics website

 
1891 establishments in California
Educational institutions established in 1891
Goleta, California
Public universities and colleges in California
Schools accredited by the Western Association of Schools and Colleges
Tourist attractions in Santa Barbara, California
Universities and colleges in Santa Barbara County, California
Santa Barbara